Vaŭkavysk District is a district in Grodno Region of Belarus.

The administrative center is Vaŭkavysk.

Notable residents 
Larysa Hienijuš (1910, Žlobaǔcy estate - 1983), Belarusian poet, writer and active participant of the national movement

References

Districts of Grodno Region